Rudolph Edward Hulswitt (February 23, 1877 in Newport, Kentucky – January 16, 1950 in Louisville, Kentucky), was a professional baseball player who played shortstop in the Major Leagues from -. Hulswitt played for the Philadelphia Phillies, Cincinnati Reds, Louisville Colonels, and St. Louis Cardinals.

External links

1877 births
1950 deaths
19th-century baseball players
Baseball players from Kentucky
Boston Braves scouts
Boston Red Sox coaches
Chattanooga Lookouts players
Cincinnati Reds players
Columbus Senators players
Jersey City Skeeters players
Joplin Miners players
Louisville Colonels players
Major League Baseball shortstops
Marion Glass Blowers players
Minor league baseball managers
Newport News Shipbuilders players
Pawhuska Huskers players
People from Newport, Kentucky
Philadelphia Phillies players
St. Joseph Saints players
St. Louis Cardinals players
Toledo Iron Men players